Arie Lamme (8 January 1748 – 18 March 1801) was a Dutch landscape painter and poet.

Early life and education

Lamme was born at Heerjansdam and studied under Joris Ponse at Utrecht; he practiced in the style of Aelbert Cuyp. He was much engaged on decorative work, and was also a poet. His daughter Cornelia married the painter Johann Baptist Scheffer and was the mother of Ary and Hendrik Scheffer.  He died in  Dordrecht, aged 53.

External links
 Arie Lamme at the RKD

Attribution:
 

1748 births
1801 deaths
18th-century Dutch painters
18th-century Dutch male artists
Dutch male painters
Dutch male poets
People from Heerjansdam